Charly Loubet (26 January 1946 – 30 January 2023) was a French footballer who played as a striker. In 1962, he became the youngest professional football player in France by signing with AS Cannes. After that, he played all his career in France, playing for Stade Français, two spells at OGC Nice and Olympique Marseille before returning to AS Cannes, where he became coach. He earned 36 caps for France in the 1970s, scoring 10 goals.

Loubet died on 30 January 2023, at the age of 77.

Honours
Marseille
Division 1: 1970–71

References

External links
 
 
 Charly Loubet
 His career
 Charly Loubet (36) Ziplatko
 

1946 births
2023 deaths
French footballers
Association football forwards
France international footballers
Ligue 1 players
AS Cannes players
Stade Français (association football) players
OGC Nice players
Olympique de Marseille players
French football managers
AS Cannes managers
Sportspeople from Alpes-Maritimes
People from Grasse